Besta PNG United
 Eastern Stars FC (Milne Bay)
 Gelle Hills United (Port Moresby)
 Gigira Laitepo Morobe (Lae)
 Hekari United FC (Port Moresby)
 Madang Niupetro Fox (Madang)
 NC Civil Works Oro FC
 Rapatona FC (Port Moresby)
Petro Souths FC (Mendi)
 Unitech FC (Lae)
 University Inter FC (Port Moresby)
Star Mountain F.C. (Tabubil)

Papua New Guinea
 

Football clubs
Football clubs